Ivan Fyodorovich (Hovhannes Tevadrosovich) Tevosian (1902, Shushi – 1958, Moscow) was a Soviet politician of Armenian descent. Hero of Socialist Labor (1943).

Since 1919 Tevosian was the secretary of Russian Communist Party Baku underground committee. Tevosian participated to the 10th Conference of the party.

After finishing the Academy of Mountains in 1927, he worked as the chief engineer of "Elektrostal" factory (Moscow oblast). In 1939-40 he was the Shipbuilding Minister of USSR, in 1940-48 - the Minister of Black Metallurgy, in 1948-49 and again, in the 1950s - the Minister of Metallurgy of USSR, vice-chairman of the Soviet government. Since 1956 Tevosian was the Ambassador of the USSR in Japan.

References

1902 births
1958 deaths
Politicians from Shusha
Russian people of Armenian descent
Soviet politicians
Soviet Armenians
People's commissars and ministers of the Soviet Union
Ambassadors of the Soviet Union to Japan
Heroes of Socialist Labour
Recipients of the Order of Lenin
Burials at the Kremlin Wall Necropolis